Edward M. Bowman was a member of the Dakota Territory House of Representatives and the namesake of Bowman County, North Dakota. Bowman served the southern part of the territory during the 1883 legislative session, during which the county was established.

References

Date of birth missing
Date of death missing
Members of the Dakota Territorial Legislature
19th-century American politicians
Bowman County, North Dakota
Place of birth missing